Vršovice Savings Bank Building (in  or Vršovická spořitelna) is a Neo-Renaissance building, which is located in Prague 10-Vršovice. The architect of the building was Antonin Balšánek.

Description
Antonin Balšánek designed this art nouveau building which incorporates several notable statues. On the front are two by the Czech sculptor Ladislav Šaloun. The building also includes work by sculptors Josef Mařatka and František Uprka.

This building was opened to the public in September 2012 as part of the European Heritage Days initiative.

References

Prague 10
Commercial buildings completed in 1911
Art Nouveau architecture in Prague
Art Nouveau commercial buildings
Bank buildings in the Czech Republic
Buildings and structures in Prague
1911 establishments in Austria-Hungary